Zee is the phonetic pronunciation of the letter Z in American English ("zed" in Commonwealth English).

Zee may also refer to:

People
Zee (徐), a Wu Chinese surname, an equivalent of Xu
Anthony Zee (b. 1945), Chinese-American physicist
Chief Zee (born 1941-2016), American sports fan
Ginger Zee (born 1981), American meteorologist
Hope Jane Zee (born 1930), American actress better known as Hope Holiday
Joe Zee (born 1968), American stylist
Ona Zee (born 1951), American pornographic actress
Phyllis Zee, professor
Teddy Zee, American film producer
Troi Zee, American actress
Young Zee (born 1975), American hip hop emcee

Fictional characters
Zee (The Matrix), a movie character
Coach Zee, a character in Homestar Runner
Zatanna, a DC Comics character, nicknamed "Zee"
Zee D. Bird, a main character and the sidekick of Moose
Zee, a character in True and the Rainbow Kingdom

Other uses
Zee Entertainment Enterprises, a multinational television company
Zee TV, an India-based satellite TV channel
Zee.One, the German sister channel of Zee TV
 Zee Learn, India-based educational subsidiary
Zee, a British band that released one album, Identity, in 1984
Tappan Zee, natural widening of the Hudson River in New York state, from Dutch word zee meaning sea
Tappan Zee Bridge (1955–2017)
Tappan Zee Bridge (2017–present)
Zee, a former brand of napkin made by Georgia-Pacific

See also
Z (disambiguation)
Zed (disambiguation)